Poznań Department (Polish: Departament Poznański) was a unit of administrative division and local government in Polish Duchy of Warsaw in years 1806-1815.

Capital city: Poznań

Administrative division: 10 counties.

Departments of the Duchy of Warsaw
History of Poznań
States and territories established in 1806
States and territories disestablished in 1815
19th century in Poznań